Denielsan Martins (born 16 March 1987) is a Cape Verdean sprinter. He competed in the 100 metres event at the 2013 World Championships in Athletics.

References

1987 births
Living people
Cape Verdean male sprinters
Place of birth missing (living people)
World Athletics Championships athletes for Cape Verde